Pliocardia is a genus of saltwater clams, marine bivalve molluscs in the family Vesicomyidae.

Species
 Pliocardia atalantae (Cosel & Olu, 2009)
 † Pliocardia bowdeniana (Dall, 1903) 
 Pliocardia caribbea (Boss, 1967)
 Pliocardia cordata (Boss, 1968)
 Pliocardia crenulomarginata (Okutani, Kojima & Iwasaki, 2002)
 Pliocardia donacia (Dall, 1908)
 Pliocardia hayashii (Habe, 1976)
 Pliocardia indica (E. A. Smith, 1904)
 † Pliocardia italica Kiel & Taviani, 2017 
 † Pliocardia kawadai (Aoki, 1954) 
 Pliocardia krylovata A. M. Martin & Goffredi, 2012
 Pliocardia kuroshimana (Okutani, Fujikura & Kojima, 2000)
 Pliocardia ovalis (Dall, 1896)
 Pliocardia ponderosa (Boss, 1968)
 Pliocardia solidissima (Prashad, 1932)
 Pliocardia stearnsii (Dall, 1895)
 † Pliocardia tanakai Miyajima, Nobuhara & Koike, 2017
 Pliocardia ticaonica (Dall, 1908)

References

 Woodring W.P. (1925). Miocene Mollusca from Bowden Jamaica, pelecypods and scaphopods. Carnegie Institution of Washington Publication, 366 : 1–564, pl. 1-40.
 Coan, E. V.; Valentich-Scott, P. (2012). Bivalve seashells of tropical West America. Marine bivalve mollusks from Baja California to northern Peru. 2 vols, 1258 pp

External links

Vesicomyidae
Bivalve genera